The 1991 European Figure Skating Championships was a senior-level international competition held in Sofia, Bulgaria on 22–27 January 1991. Elite skaters from European ISU member nations competed in the disciplines of men's singles, ladies' singles, pair skating, and ice dancing.

Results

Men

Ladies

Pairs

Ice dancing

References

External links
 https://web.archive.org/web/20081026042005/http://www.eskatefans.com/skatabase/euromen1990.html
 https://web.archive.org/web/20091128190759/http://www.eskatefans.com/skatabase/majors.html

European Figure Skating Championships, 1991
European Figure Skating Championships
International figure skating competitions hosted by Bulgaria
European Figure Skating Championships, 1991
Sports competitions in Sofia
1990s in Sofia
January 1991 sports events in Europe